Joseph H. Turner (November 3, 1907 – July 21, 1990) was an American jazz pianist.

Biography
One of the masters of the stride piano style associated with Harlem, New York City, Turner gained his first big musical break in 1928 when he was hired for the Benny Carter Orchestra. Another break was his work accompanying Adelaide Hall, sometimes alongside Art Tatum, in the early 1930s. He also played with Louis Armstrong.  After World War II, he settled in Europe, living in Paris from 1962.  He played at La Calavados, a nightclub situated near the Champs Elysees until his death from a heart attack in 1990, at the age of 82.

References
     6. Borowsky, Mark M.D.  " Joe Turner: Last of the Stride Pianists. A Personal Remembrance. "  https://www.academia.edu/12766724/Joe_Turner_Last_of_the_Stride_Pianists

External links

Joe Turner at Jazz Rhythm

1907 births
1990 deaths
American jazz pianists
American male pianists
Boogie-woogie pianists
Jazz-blues pianists
Jazz musicians from New York (state)
20th-century American pianists
20th-century American male musicians
American male jazz musicians